Daniel Greaves (born 4 October 1982) is a British athlete who specialises in the discus throw.

Biography
Greaves was born in Anstey, Leicestershire in 1982.

Greaves won the gold medal in the F44/46 category discus throw at the 2004 Summer Paralympics in Athens, establishing a new world record with a throw of 55.12m. He had previously won silver at the 2000 Summer Paralympics in Sydney.

Despite being born with a deformity of the feet, Greaves was selected to join the British able-bodied team in a competition against the United States in 2001.

Greaves competed in the 2008 Summer Paralympics in Beijing, winning a bronze medal in the F44 discus throw.

He broke the world record again at the pre-IPC World Athletics Championships in New Zealand in January 2011, throwing 59.98m on his fourth throw.

He won Bronze at the 2020 Summer Paralympics in Tokyo. In doing so he became the first British track and field athlete to win medals at six consecutive Paralympic Games.

References

1982 births
Living people
Athletes (track and field) at the 2000 Summer Paralympics
Athletes (track and field) at the 2004 Summer Paralympics
Athletes (track and field) at the 2008 Summer Paralympics
Athletes (track and field) at the 2012 Summer Paralympics
Athletes (track and field) at the 2016 Summer Paralympics
Paralympic athletes of Great Britain
Paralympic gold medalists for Great Britain
Paralympic silver medalists for Great Britain
Paralympic bronze medalists for Great Britain
Commonwealth Games gold medallists for England
Athletes (track and field) at the 2014 Commonwealth Games
Medalists at the 2000 Summer Paralympics
Medalists at the 2004 Summer Paralympics
Medalists at the 2008 Summer Paralympics
Medalists at the 2012 Summer Paralympics
Medalists at the 2016 Summer Paralympics
British disabled sportspeople
Sportspeople from Leicestershire
British male discus throwers
English male discus throwers
Commonwealth Games medallists in athletics
People from Anstey, Leicestershire
Paralympic medalists in athletics (track and field)
Athletes (track and field) at the 2020 Summer Paralympics
Discus throwers with limb difference
Paralympic discus throwers
Medallists at the 2014 Commonwealth Games